Marcus Harley Maddison (born 26 September 1993) is an English semi-professional footballer who plays as a winger or attacking midfielder.

Maddison began his career at Newcastle United, but did not play a senior game for the club. He was signed by Blyth Spartans and St Johnstone, before scoring 13 Conference Premier goals for Gateshead in a 12-month period from August 2013. He was signed by Peterborough United for an undisclosed fee in August 2014. The same year, he was also capped by England C.

After a brief loan spell at Hull City in 2020, Maddison joined Charlton Athletic on a free transfer, but struggled to make consistent appearances and was loaned out to Bolton Wanderers in 2021. After his loan was cut short in April 2021, Maddison announced his decision to quit professional football after expressing his diminished enjoyment in the sport, along with the negative effect his career was having on his wellbeing. He subsequently joined eighth tier side Spalding United.

Playing career

Early career
Maddison began his career at Newcastle United. He was loaned out to Blyth Spartans in November 2012 to gain experience, where he scored once in two appearances. He was released by Newcastle in 2013, with Reserve team manager Willie Donachie saying he had "a lot to learn". He went on to join St Johnstone on 8 March 2013.

Gateshead
After failing to make an appearance at St Johnstone he signed with Conference Premier club Gateshead in August 2013 following a successful trial. He was named as Conference Premier Player of the Month in January 2014. He saw a reignition to his career and scored 13 league goals for Gateshead in 34 league appearances.

Peterborough
After scoring 4 goals in his first 5 games of the 2014–15 season for Gateshead, he was signed by Peterborough United in August 2014 for an undisclosed fee, signing a four-year contract; manager Darren Ferguson said that "he has good balance, skill, pace and we feel this could be a good signing". The fee was a club-record for Gateshead (reported as £250,000 with the potential to rise to £500,000), and manager Gary Mills said "he was a good player but could be selfish at times".

In October 2014, Maddison won the Football League Young Player of the month after scoring 4 goals in 5 games. He was given a red card in a 1–0 victory against Leyton Orient in a 1–0 victory on 7 March 2015. In his first season at the club he scored 8 goals in 30 games in all competitions. On 31 August 2017, Maddison signed a new three-year deal at Peterborough United.

He scored 12 goals and made 22 assists in all competitions during the 2017–18 season. In April 2018 he was nominated for the EFL League One Player of the Season award, alongside teammate Jack Marriott. On 30 April, Maddison won the Peterborough United Goal Of The Season Award. On 10 May 2018, Maddison was placed on the transfer list by owner Darragh MacAnthony, who as part of an agreement said that as part of Maddison's new contract in 2017, if Peterborough United failed to get promotion he would allow him to leave.

He had a contract option exercised by Peterborough United at the end of the 2018–19 season.

In June 2019, he was linked with a transfer to Hull City, to join up with former Peterborough manager Grant McCann and defender Ryan Tafazolli.

On 12 June 2020, Maddison was released by Peterborough United. In his six years at the club he played 240 games and scored 62 goals in all competitions.

On 8 August 2020, after being released by Peterborough, Maddison played in a friendly match for local side Peterborough Sports against Yaxley F.C. to regain and maintain his fitness while he looked for a new club. Maddison played the first 45 minutes before being replaced by Josh Moreman, who scored the only goal for Peterborough Sports later in the match. The match ended 1–0.

Hull City (loan)

Maddison signed a six-month loan deal with Hull City on 31 January 2020. He made his debut for Hull on 1 February 2020, when he came on as a substitute for Mallik Wilks in the 1–5 home defeat to Brentford.
He scored his first goal for the club on 14 February 2020 when he scored Hull's second goal in a 4–4 draw against Swansea City.

Charlton Athletic

On 1 October 2020, Maddison joined Charlton Athletic on a one-year deal with the option of a second year. He scored his first goal for Charlton in an EFL Trophy tie against Leyton Orient on 10 November 2020.

On 18 May 2021, it was announced that Maddison would leave Charlton Athletic at the end of his contract.

Bolton Wanderers (loan)
On 1 February 2021, Maddison joined Bolton Wanderers on loan for the rest of the 2020-21 season. His debut came on 9 February as a substitute against as Morecambe, however he was sent off after 12 minutes. The match ended 1–1, Morecambe's goal coming shortly after his red card. Bolton successfully appealed against the sending off, meaning he would miss no matches.

On 12 April 2021, it was announced by Bolton Wanderers that Maddison's loan spell would be cut short having made 10 first-team appearances for the club without scoring. In an Instagram post released a few hours later, Maddison admitted that he was considering ending his footballing career altogether, stating "the abuse, pressure and monotony has just got to me" and expressed his current lack of enjoyment in the sport. Maddison later confirmed his decision to end his professional football career in another Instagram post.

Spalding United
On 18 May 2021, Maddison joined eighth-tier club Spalding United, managed by former-Peterborough teammate Gabriel Zakuani. He made his debut on 14 August, scoring in a 2–1 win against Loughborough Dynamo. In February 2022, having previously suffered a possible career ending injury, he set up a GoFundMe in an attempt to fund a surgery in the hopes it would help him continue his career. He reached the target in less than 24 hours.

Darlington
In June 2022, Maddison joined National League North club Darlington. On 13 October, he left by mutual consent.

Style of play

Maddison is also a freekick specialist. In 2014, he described his unusual freekick technique: "Everyone asks how I do it. You use the side of your foot, but you're hitting it more with your heel. If you hit with the middle of the side of your foot it just curls. If you hit it the way I do, it goes straight and moves at the same time." His style of play has also been compared to playmaker Mesut Ozil.

Career statistics

Honours
Bolton Wanderers
EFL League Two third-place (promotion): 2020–21

Individual
Conference Premier Player of the Month: January 2014
Football League Young Player of the Month: October 2014

References

External links
 
 

1993 births
Living people
Sportspeople from Durham, England
Footballers from County Durham
English footballers
England semi-pro international footballers
Association football midfielders
Newcastle United F.C. players
Blyth Spartans A.F.C. players
St Johnstone F.C. players
Gateshead F.C. players
Peterborough United F.C. players
Hull City A.F.C. players
Charlton Athletic F.C. players
Bolton Wanderers F.C. players
Spalding United F.C. players
Darlington F.C. players
National League (English football) players
English Football League players
Northern Premier League players